The Department for Science, Innovation and Technology (DSIT) is a department of the government of the United Kingdom. Established in February 2023, DSIT took on policy responsibilities from the former Department for Business, Energy and Industrial Strategy (BEIS) and the Department for Digital, Culture, Media and Sport. The new department is responsible for helping to encourage, develop and manage the UK's scientific, research, and technological outputs. DSIT is also responsible for managing the necessary physical and digital infrastructure and regulation to support the British economy, UK public services, national security, and wider UK Government priorities.

The department is led by the Secretary of State for Science, Innovation and Technology, supported by a number of junior ministers, and senior civil servants. The incumbent Secretary of State is Michelle Donelan; she is the first to hold the role, having previously been the final Secretary of State for Digital, Culture, Media and Sport.

History
The department was established on 7 February 2023 after a cabinet reshuffle by Prime Minister Rishi Sunak. It absorbed some of the functions and responsibilities of the former Department for Business, Energy and Industrial Strategy (BEIS) and the 'Digital' portfolio from the former Department for Digital, Culture, Media and Sport (DCMS). The new department's first Secretary of State, Michelle Donelan, was the final Secretary of State for Digital, Culture, Media and Sport. Additionally, the new department became responsible for a number of agencies and offices drawn from across the rest of the UK Government. These included the Government Office for Science (formerly under BEIS), the Office for Science and Technology Strategy (formerly of the Cabinet Office), the Office for Life Sciences (jointly with the Department of Health and Social Care (DHSC), formerly a BEIS-DHSC joint unit) and the Office for Artificial Intelligence (formerly of the Department for Digital, Culture, Media and Sport).

Responsibilities
The following responsibilities of DSIT were outlined by Rishi Sunak upon the department's establishment in 2023.

Research and innovation
DSIT is responsible for positioning the UK at the forefront of global scientific and technological advancement. It is intended for the department to drive innovation that changes lives and sustains economic growth. It will do this by maintaining and developing the physical and digital infrastructure and regulation necessary to support the UK economy and public services, and UK national security.

Another stated responsibility of the department is to put British public services, including the NHS and schools at the forefront of innovation, championing new ways of working (with an express focus on STEM subjects to improve outcomes for people.

DSIT is further responsible for managing the UK Government's Research and Development schemes, aiming to optimise public investment to support areas of relative UK strength and increase the level of private investment in an effort to make the UK economy the "most innovative" in the world. Moreover, DSIT is charged with promoting a diverse research and innovation system that connects discovery to new companies, growth and jobs – including by delivering world-class physical and digital infrastructure. This is with the professed intention of making the UK the "best place" to start and grow a technology business or to develop and attract "top talent." DSIT also functions as a means of strengthening international collaboration on science and technology in line with the findings of the 2021 Integrated Review, and to ensure that British researchers are able to continue to work with leading scientists in Europe and around the world.

Legislation and regulation
On a legislative and regulatory level, DSIT is responsible for delivering key 
legislative and regulatory reforms to drive competition and promote innovation. This includes completing the passage of a new Online Safety Bill, a new Data Protection and Digital Information Bill and a new Digital Markets, Competition and Consumer Bill. DSIT is also responsible for leading the UK Government's pro-innovation approach to regulating AI.

Ministers
The Department's ministerial team in February 2023 consisted of:

The department's ministers are supported by the department's civil servants under the leadership of a Permanent Secretary. The incumbent Permanent Secretary is Sarah Munby; previously the final Permanent Secretary at the now defunct Department for Business, Energy and Industrial Strategy.

The Government Chief Scientific Adviser is also attached to the department, and holds the rank of Permanent Secretary. The incumbent Chief Scientific Adviser (until April 2023) is Sir Patrick Vallance. His successor in this role from April 2023 will be Dame Angela McLean.

See also
 Department for Digital, Culture, Media and Sport (2017-2023) - from which DSIT absorbed the digital portfolio.
 Department for Business, Energy and Industrial Strategy (2016-2023) - defunct department from which DSIT inherited various responsibilities
 Department for Innovation, Universities and Skills (2007-2009) - a defunct UK government department with a similar overall purpose.
 Ministry of Technology (1964-1970) - an historic UK government department with similar responsibilities.
 UK Research and Innovation
 Advanced Research and Invention Agency

References

External links
Official webpage on GOV.UK.
Making Government Deliver: Updating the machinery of government for the world of today and of tomorrow policy paper forwarded by Rishi Sunak explaining the rationale for the department.

2023 establishments in the United Kingdom
Innovation ministries
Research ministries
Innovation in the United Kingdom
Ministries established in 2023
Science and technology ministries
Ministerial departments of the Government of the United Kingdom